Miss Grand Cambodia 2021 was the seventh edition of the Miss Grand Cambodia beauty pageant, held at the AEON Mall, Sen Sok City in Phnom Penh, on October 10, 2021.  Twenty-five contestants, who qualified for the national contest through online screening, competed for the title, of whom a 23-year-old nursing student Miss City Tourism and Miss-Asia Pacific International Cambodia former from Battambang, Sothida Pokimtheng, was named the winner.She later represented Cambodia in the Miss Grand International 2021 held that year in Thailand on December 4, where she placed among the top 10 finalists and also won the Miss Popular Vote awards.

The final coronation event, originally scheduled for September 25, was broadcast live to the audience nationwide on the Royal Cambodian Armed Forces Television channel 5 (TV5).

Result

Final placement

Note:
  Automatically qualified for the top 10 after winning the fast track, Miss Popular vote.

Special awards

Contestants
Contestants from twenty-five provinces competed for the title of Miss Grand Cambodia 2021.

Banteay Meanchey – Eam Phaya
Battambang – Po Kimtheng Sothida
Bavet – Sreyley Phon
 Kampong Cham – In Leakhena
Kampong Chhnang – Sok Ratcharakorn
Kampong Speu – Leng Chantha
Kampong Thom – Ol Rina
Kampot – Keo Senglyhour
Kandal – Vat Chenda
Kep – Chhum Mengly
Koh Kong – Phem Sreynor
Kratié – Lim Danin
Mondulkiri – Nhem Srey Tey
Oddar Meanchey – Thon Panha
Pailin – Lim Naly
Phnom Penh – Sam Sereyroth
Preah Vihear – Va Malina
Prey Veng – Pok Sreyleak
Pursat – Yun Navy
Ratanakiri – Chhuon Malen
Siem Reap – Bee Za
Preah Sihanouk – Em Kun Thong
Stung Treng – Som Vayyey
Svay Rieng – Yeang Sonita
Takéo – Phou Phattiya
Tboung Khmom – Srean Sithay

References

External links 

 
Miss Grand Cambodia
Grand Cambodia